Rosengart may refer to:

 Lucien Rosengart 1881 - 1976, founder and till 1936 proprietor of the Rosengart automaking business
 Automobiles L. Rosengart,  an automobile manufacturer between 1927 and 1955
 Rosengart, Saskatchewan

See also 
Rosengarten (disambiguation)

German-language surnames
Jewish surnames
Yiddish-language surnames